Legionella geestiana is a gram-negative bacterium from the genus Legionella.

References

External links
Type strain of Legionella geestiana at BacDive -  the Bacterial Diversity Metadatabase

Legionellales
Bacteria described in 1993